Singuerlín is the name of a Barcelona Metro station in the municipality of Santa Coloma de Gramenet, in the neighbourhood of Singuerlín, located in the northern part of the metropolitan area of Barcelona. It's served by L9, the first part of Line 9 to be opened, between Can Zam and Can Peixauet.

Services

See also
List of Barcelona Metro stations

External links
Trenscat.com

Barcelona Metro line 9 stations
Railway stations in Spain opened in 2009
Transport in Santa Coloma de Gramenet